The Serbian League Vojvodina (Serbian: Srpska liga Vojvodina) is a third tier football league in Serbia. The league is operated by the Vojvodina FA(FSV). 16 teams competed in the league for the 2015–16 season. Winner was be promoted to the 2016–17 Serbian First League. Three teams were relegated from the league.

2015–16 teams

League table

Results

References

External links
 Official website 
 srbijasport.net page dedicated to 2015–2016 season 

Serbian League Vojvodina seasons
3
Serb